Iran–Mexico relations are the bilateral ties between the United Mexican States and the Islamic Republic of Iran. Both nations are members of the Group of 15, Group of 24, and the United Nations.

History

The first diplomatic contacts between Qajar Iran (then known as "Persia") and Porfiriato-era Mexico took place in 1889. In May 1903, a treaty of friendship was signed between the two nations, however, it was later abolished and declared null by the Iranian government in May 1928 due to a technicality. In 1937, a new treaty was signed between the two nations and on 15 October 1964, formal diplomatic relations were established. In May 1975, Mohammad Reza Pahlavi paid a high-level visit to Mexico, where he met with Mexican president Luis Echeverría. During the Shah's visit, he and Echeverría discussed events transpiring in the Middle East at the time; both leaders agreed to strengthen their bilateral relations and to open embassies in each other's capitals. In July 1975, Echeverría paid an official visit to Iran, the first and only visit to the country by a sitting Mexican head of state.

In January 1978, anti-government demonstrations intensified in Iran, and were followed by the Islamic Revolution. The Iranian monarchy was consequently abolished and replaced with an Islamic republic while the Pahlavi dynasty fled the country into exile. After first fleeing to Egypt, Morocco, and the Bahamas, the Pahlavi family arrived in Mexico in June 1979, where they were granted political asylum. Fearing reprisals by the Iranian people and the new government for its decision in allowing the Shah to seek asylum in Mexico; Mexico closed its embassy in Tehran. As a result, Iran downgraded its diplomatic representation in Mexico to that of a chargé d'affaires. In October 1979, the Shah left Mexico and entered the United States for cancer treatment; he later succumbed to his illness in July 1980 in Cairo, Egypt.

In July 1992, Mexico re-opened its embassy in Tehran and in 1994, a joint Iran–Mexico conference was held in Tehran with the objective of strengthening bilateral relations. A second conference took place seven years later, in 2001, in Mexico City. In December 2014, an Iranian parliamentarian delegation visited Mexico to mark 50 years since the two states established diplomatic relations. 

In October 2016, an exhibition of “Pre-Hispanic Codices of Mexico” was opened in the National Museum of Iran and the National Library of Iran in Tehran. These were 26 representative codices of the Aztec, Mayan, Mixtec, and Toltec civilizations.

High-level visits

From Iran to Mexico
 Shah Mohammad Reza Pahlavi (1975)
 Foreign Minister Ali Akbar Velayati (1993)
 Foreign Vice-Minister Majid Takht-Ravanchi (2015)
 Foreign Minister Mohammad Javad Zarif (2016)

From Mexico to Iran
 President Luis Echeverría (1975)
 Foreign Minister Fernando Solana Morales (1992)
 Foreign Undersecretary Carmen Moreno (2000)
 Foreign Undersecretary Carlos de Icaza (2014)

Bilateral agreements
Both countries have signed some bilateral agreements such as the Friendship Agreement (1903); Agreement on Scientific and Technical Cooperation (1975); Agreement on Cultural Cooperation (1975); and the Memorandum of Understanding to Strengthen Inter-Parliamentary Links (2014).

Trade
Iran and Mexico have enjoyed increasingly close political and economic relations over the years. The two countries aim to expand cooperation in several sectors, sharing science and technology, particularly in the oil industry.

Iran's main exports to Mexico include goods for the assembly or manufacture of aircraft, marble, carpets, and parts for turbochargers and superchargers. Mexico's main exports to Iran include scissors, chewing gum, razors, distilled water, toothbrushes, including brushes for dentures, wheat, tubers roots, and vegetable materials of the species used mainly in the manufacture of brooms, brushes, sesame oil, and sodium salts. Mexico is Iran's principal trading partner in Latin America.

Resident diplomatic missions
 Iran has an embassy in Mexico City.
 Mexico has an embassy in Tehran.

References

 
Mexico
Bilateral relations of Mexico